Fibroblast growth factor-binding protein 1 is a protein that in humans is encoded by the FGFBP1 gene.

FGFBP1, or HBP17, binds to both acidic (FGF1; MIM 131220) and basic (FGF2; MIM 134920) fibroblast growth factors in a reversible manner. It also binds to perlecan (HSPG2; MIM 142461).[supplied by OMIM]

Interactions
FGFBP1 has been shown to interaction with Perlecan.

References

Further reading